Copelatus sudrei is a species of diving beetle. It is part of the subfamily Copelatinae in the family Dytiscidae. It was described by Bameul in 2003.

References

sudrei
Beetles described in 2003